Jan Káňa may refer to:

 Jan Káňa (ice hockey, born 1990)
 Jan Káňa (ice hockey, born 1992)